Harrisburgh may refer to a location in the United States:

Harrisburgh, California
Harrisburg, New York
Harrisburg, Texas
Harrisburg, Pennsylvania

See also
Harrisburg (disambiguation)